Erna Vasilievna Pomérantseva (1899-1980,  Hoffman) was a Russian folklorist.

Pomerantseva was born on 7/19 April 1899, and graduated in 1922 from the philological and historical faculty of Moscow State University.

She was an associate professor in the Moscow State University department of folklore from its foundation in 1938 until 1958, and acting head of department in 1957–1958.

Her research focused on Russian fairy tales, the connections between literature and folklore, and the role of folklore today. She led many expeditions to collect folklore. Her 1964 thesis at the Institute of Anthropology and Ethnography had the title Судьбы русской сказки в XVIII-XX вв. (The fate of the Russian fairy tale in the 17th-20th centuries).

Her work Русские народные сказки (Russian Folk Tales, 1957) was translated into German as Russische Volksmärchen (Akademie Verlag, 1966) and was in its 13th edition in 2021.

Erna Pomérantseva died on 11 August 1980, aged 81.

Selected publications

  Русские народные сказки (Russian Folk Tales, 1957), translated as:

References

External links
Pomerantseva's publications in the catalogue of the National Library of Russia

1899 births
1980 deaths
Russian folklorists
20th-century Russian women